Köýtendag Nature Reserve, formerly Kugitang Nature Reserve, is a nature reserve (zapovednik) in the extreme east of Turkmenistan.

Geography 
Established in 1986, it is located in the Köýtendag Range of Lebap Province and covers an area of 271.4 km2. It spreads in the middle and upper mountain belt at an altitude of 900–3139 meters above sea level. The main feature of Koytendag are cave complexes ( more than 300 caves ) that are unique in Eurasia and the diversity of geological processes that formed them and the beauty of geological phenomena.

The highest peak of Turkmenistan—Aýrybaba—falls in this nature reserve.

Sanctuaries 
It also incorporates four sanctuaries:
 Garlyk Sanctuary - established in 1986.
 Hojapil Sanctuary - established in 1986.
 Hojaburjybelent Sanctuary - established in 1986.
 Hojagarawul Sanctuary - established in 1999.

Flora and Fauna 
This place is one of the 50 important areas for birds and biodiversity in Turkmenistan. The reserve is home for the rare Heptner's markhor (Capra falconeri heptneri).

References
National Program for the Protection of the Environment, Ashgabat, 2002, pp. 149–151

External links
 https://web.archive.org/web/20090609072344/http://natureprotection.gov.tm/reserve_tm.html

Nature reserves in Turkmenistan
Protected areas established in 1986
1986 establishments in Turkmenistan
World Heritage Tentative List